Nanofila is a genus of marine heterotrophic protists of the phylum Cercozoa. It is the only genus in the family Nanofilidae. It is a monotypic genus, with the sole species N. marina.

Morphology
Nanofila are small amoebae with unbranched, granular filopodia. They lack cilia, have a spherical shape of around 3 μm in diameter, and extend about six extremely thin filopodia that lie flat against the substrate.

References

External links

Cercozoa genera